Mohammed Benchrifa is a Moroccan footballer. He usually plays as defender. Benchrifa is currently an assistant coach for Wydad Casablanca

External links

1975 births
Living people
Moroccan footballers
Morocco international footballers
Moghreb Tétouan players
Fath Union Sport players
Footballers from Casablanca
Association football defenders